Heart 90s is a national digital radio station owned and operated by Global as a spin-off from Heart. The station broadcasts from studios at Leicester Square in London.

Launched on 29 August 2019, Heart 90s is a rolling music service playing non-stop “feel good” music from the 1990s. It has its own dedicated live breakfast show, hosted by Kevin Hughes, 6–10am on weekdays. At other times, the station is mostly an automated service.

The first song played on the station was "Wannabe" by the Spice Girls. On 12 November 2019, the station launched on Sky channel 0217, following sister station Heart Dance launching on there a month earlier.

References

External links 

1990s
Global Radio
Radio stations established in 2019
1990s-themed radio stations